The Protestant Church in Western Indonesia (abbreviated as GPIB) is a Reformed Church, and its theology is based on the teaching of John Calvin. It was established on 31 October 1948. It was called the "De Protestantse Kerk in Westelijk Indonesie", founded in 1605 in Ambon, Moluccas. In its formative years it consisted of seven classes: Jabar, Java, Jatim, Sumatra, Bangka, Borneo, Sulawesi. It is a member of the World Communion of Reformed Churches the World Council of Churches and the Christian Conference in Asia.

Statistics

The denomination has 600,000 members and 300 congregations and 430 pastors in 2006. It is a national multi-ethnic church, scattered over 25 out of the 32 provinces of Indonesia.

The denomination is one of the biggest Protestant churches in Indonesia and is part of the Protestant Church in Indonesia.

According to the recent statistics the church is growing rapidly, has 1,305,000 adherents and members. The Synod Office is located in Jakarta.

References

External links
Official website

1948 establishments in Indonesia
Calvinist denominations established in the 20th century
Members of the World Communion of Reformed Churches
Reformed denominations in Indonesia
Religious organizations based in Indonesia
Christian organizations established in 1948